The Soper River (Inuktitut: , meaning "the great river") is a waterway on Baffin Island, Nunavut. The Soper River was designated a Canadian Heritage River in 1992.

Research
The Soper River region's plants have not been studied or inventoried since the 1920s. In June 2012 four Canadian botanists from the National Herbarium of Canada travelled to the Soper River region to assess the region's botanical biodiversity by collecting samples and cataloguing the plant specimens.  The expedition was part of a five-year project to record Arctic flora and improve the taxonomy of the Arctic ecology.

See also
List of rivers of Nunavut

References

Rivers of Qikiqtaaluk Region
Canadian Heritage Rivers
Bodies of water of Baffin Island